Theophany (from Ancient Greek  , meaning "appearance of a deity") is a personal encounter with a deity, that is an event where the manifestation of a deity occurs in an observable way. Specifically, it "refers to the temporal and spatial manifestation of God in some tangible form."

Where the deity does not take tangible form (outward manifestation), the broader term used for inward manifestation is divine revelation or divine inspiration. Where the existence of a god is attributed to a human person, here the terms used are divine incarnation, an avatar or, poetically, the personification of that deity.

Traditionally the term "theophany" was used to refer to appearances of the gods in ancient Greek and in Near Eastern religions. While the Iliad is the earliest source for descriptions of theophanies in classical antiquity (which occur throughout Greek mythology), probably the earliest description appears in the Epic of Gilgamesh.

In the specific usage for Christians and Jews, with respect to the Bible, theophany refers to an event where the Abrahamic God reveals his presence to a person.

Ancient Greek religion

The appearance of Zeus to Semele is more than a mortal can stand and she is burned to death by the flames of his power. However, most Greek theophanies were less deadly. Unusual for Greek mythology is the story of Prometheus, not an Olympian but a Titan, who brought knowledge of fire to humanity. Divine or heroic epiphanies were sometimes experienced in historical times, either in dreams or as a waking vision, and frequently led to the foundation of a cult, or at least an act of worship and the dedication of a commemorative offering.

Theophanies were reenacted at a number of Greek sites and festivals. At Delphi the Theophania (Θεοφάνια) was an annual festival in spring celebrating the return of Apollo from his winter quarters in Hyperborea. The culmination of the festival was a display of an image of the gods, usually hidden in the sanctuary, to worshippers. Later Roman mystery religions often included similar brief displays of images to excited worshippers.

Hinduism

Hinduism uses darśana, the Sanskrit for "sighting", for the sighting of a god.  Gods taking form on earth are referred to as avatars. The most popular avatars of Vishnu in Hinduism are Krishna and Rama. The most well-known theophany is contained within the Bhagavad-Gita, itself one chapter of the larger epic the Mahabharata. On the battlefield of Kurukshetra, Krishna gives the famed warrior Arjuna a series of teachings, and Arjuna begs for Krishna to reveal his "universal form." Krishna complies and gives Arjuna the spiritual vision which enables him to see Krishna in that form, a magnificent and awe-inspiring manifestation, containing everything in the universe. A description of this theophany forms the main part of Chapter XI.

A number of theophanies are described in the Sanskrit epic the Mahabharata. Among the first is the god Indra's appearance to Kunti, with the subsequent birth of the hero Arjuna.  Near the end of the epic, the god Yama, referred to as Dharma in the text, is portrayed as taking the form of a dog to test the compassion of Yudhishthira, who is told he may not enter paradise with such an animal, but refuses to abandon his companion, for which decision he is then praised by Dharma.

Judaism

The Hebrew Bible states that God revealed himself to mankind. God speaks with Adam and Eve in Eden; with Cain; with Noah and his sons; and with Abraham and his wife Sarah. He also appears twice to Hagar, the slave-girl who has Abraham's first child, Ishmael.

The first revelation that Moses had of Yahweh at the burning bush was "a great sight"; "he was afraid to look" at him (Ex. 3:3, 6); also the first revelation Samuel had in a dream is called "the vision"; afterward God was frequently "seen" at Shiloh (I Sam. 3:15, 21, Hebr.). Isaiah's first revelation was also a sight of God (Isa. 6:1–5); Amos had visions (Amos 7:1, 4; 8:1; 9:1); and so with Jeremiah (Jer. 1:11, 13), Ezekiel (Ezek. 1-3; 8:1–3; 10), and Zechariah (Zech. 1-14,2:13), and, in fact, with all "seers," as they called themselves.

Balaam also boasted of being one who saw "the vision of the Almighty" (Num. 24:4).

In Job, Eliphaz describes a vision: “Amid thoughts from visions of the night, when deep sleep falls on mortals, dread came upon me, and trembling, which made all my bones shake. A spirit glided past my face; the hair of my flesh bristled. It stood still, but I could not discern its appearance. A form was before my eyes; there was silence, then I heard a voice:..." (Job 4:13-16).

The Torah lays stress on the fact that, while to other prophets God made himself known in a vision, speaking to them in a dream, he spoke with Moses "mouth to mouth", "as a man would speak with his neighbor", in clear sight and not in riddles (Num. 12:6–8; comp. Ex. 33:11; Deut. 34:10).

The burning bush 
In Midian, while Moses was keeping the flock of his father in law Jethro, the angel of the Lord appeared to Moses in a bush that burned but was not consumed. Yahweh called to Moses out of the midst of the bush, and told him that he had heard the affliction of his people in Egypt, and gave Moses orders to speak to Pharaoh and to lead the Israelites out of Egypt.

The pillar of cloud and pillar of fire 

 
God reveals his divine presence and protection to the Israelites by leading them out of Egypt and through the Sinai desert by appearing as a pillar of cloud by day and a pillar of fire by night.

According to Rabbi Eliezer, each person among the Israelites, including even the least intelligent bond-woman, saw God's glory at the Red Sea in clearer form than did, afterward, prophets of the stamp of Ezekiel; wherefore they burst forth into the song, "This is my God" (Mek.(Mekiita), l.c., with reference to Exodus xv. 2).

Mount Sinai 
YHWH's manifestation is accompanied by thunder and lightning; there is a fiery flame, reaching to the sky; the loud notes of a trumpet are heard; and the whole mountain smokes and quakes. Out of the midst of the flame and the cloud a voice reveals the Ten Commandments. Moses in his blessing points to this revelation as to the source of the election of Israel, but with this difference: with him the point of departure for the theophany is Mount Sinai and not heaven. God appears on Sinai like a shining sun and comes "accompanied by holy myriads" (comp. Sifre, Deut. 243).

Likewise, in the Song of Deborah the manifestation is described as a storm: the earth quakes, Sinai trembles, and the clouds drop water. It is poetically elaborated in the prayer of Habakkuk (Hab. iii.); here past and future are confused. As in Deut. xxxiii. 2 and Judges v. 4, God appears from Teman and Paran. His majesty is described as a glory of light and brightness; pestilence precedes Him. The mountains tremble violently; the earth quakes; the people are sore afraid. God rides in a chariot of war, with horses – a conception found also in Isa. xix. 1 where God appears on a cloud, and in Ps. xviii. 10 where He appears on a cherub.

In Isaiah and Ezekiel 

The biblical prophets Isaiah and Ezekiel receive their commissions as prophets amid glorious manifestations of God. Isaiah sees God on a high and lofty throne. More precisely, however, he sees not him but only his glorious robe, the hem and train of which fill the whole temple of heaven. Before the throne stand the seraphim, the six-winged angels. With two wings they cover their faces so as not to gaze on God; with two they cover their feet, through modesty; and with the remaining two they fly. Their occupation is the everlasting praise of God, which at the time of the revelation took the form of the thrice-repeated cry "Holy!" (Isa. vi.).

Ezekiel in his description is not so reserved as Isaiah. The divine throne appears to him as a wonderful chariot. Storm, a great cloud, ceaseless fire, and on all sides a wonderful brightness accompany the manifestation. Out of the fire four creatures become visible. They have the faces of men; each one has four wings; and the shape of their feet enables them to go to all four-quarters of the earth with equal rapidity and without having to turn. These living creatures are recognized by the prophet as cherubim (Ezek. x 20 ). The heavenly fire, the coals of which burn like torches, moves between them. The movement of the creatures is harmonious: wherever the spirit of God leads them they go.

Beneath the living creatures are wheels (ofannim) full of eyes. On their heads rests a firmament upon which is the throne of God. When the divine chariot moves, their wings rustle with a noise like thunder. On the throne the prophet sees the divine being, having the likeness of a man. His body from the loins upward is shining (ḥashmal); downward it is fire (in Ezek. viii. 2 the reverse is stated). In the Sinaitic revelation God descends and appears upon earth. In the prophetic vision, on the other hand, he appears in heaven, which is in keeping with the nature of the case, because the Sinaitic revelation was meant for a whole people, on the part of which an ecstatic condition cannot be thought of.

David's theophany 
David is in great need and at his earnest solicitation God appears to save him. Before God the earth trembles and fire glows. God rides on a cherub on the wind. God is surrounded by clouds which are outshone by God's brightness. With thunder and lightning God destroys the enemies of the singer and rescues him.

Christianity

Christians generally recognize the same Old Testament theophanies as the Jews.  In addition there are at least two theophanies mentioned in the New Testament.  While some usages refer to the baptisms of Jesus and John the Baptist as "theophanies, scholars eschew such usage.

The 4th-century bishop Eusebius of Caesarea, b. 263 AD, wrote a treatise "On Divine Manifestation" (Peri theophaneias), referring to the incarnation of Jesus, but generally divine incarnation is not regarded as theophantic, as it lacks the "temporariness and suddenness of the appearance of God".

Traditional analysis of the Biblical passages led Christian scholars to understand theophany as an unambiguous manifestation of God to man. Otherwise, the more general term hierophany is used.

Catholic Christianity

In this case, initially it is an angel which appears to Hagar, however it then says that God spoke directly to her, and that she saw God and lived.

However, the angel addressing Abraham speaks the words of God in the first person. In both of the last two examples, although it is an angel speaking, the voice is of God spoken through the angel, since it says "withhold from me". A similar case would be Moses and the burning bush. Initially Moses saw an angel in the bush, but then goes on to have a direct conversation with God himself (Exodus 3).

The New Catholic Encyclopedia, however, makes few references to a theophany from the gospels. Mark 1:9-11, where only Jesus hears the voice from heaven, and Luke 9:28–36 the transfiguration where the Father speaks are cited.

Orthodox Christianity

Eastern Orthodox Churches celebrate the theophany of Jesus Christ on 6 January according to a liturgical calendar as one of the Great Feasts. In Western Orthodox Christian Churches, 6 January is kept as the holy day Epiphany, while the feast of Theophany is celebrated separately, on the following Sunday.

In Orthodox Christian tradition, the feast commemorates the baptism of Christ by John the Baptist.

Evangelical Christianity
Some modern Evangelical Christian Bible commentators, such as Ron Rhodes, interpret "the angel of the Lord", who appears in several places throughout the Old Testament, to be the pre-incarnate Christ, which is Jesus before his manifestation into human form, as described in the New Testament. Adaptions to his hypothesis in current evangelical research and intercollegiate debate describe these manifrstations as the post-incarnate Christ (yet to be published), as though in being a divine human capable of time travel He could foretell his later incarnation as having already lived it.  The term Christophany has also been coined to identify post-incarnate appearances of Christ in both the Old and New Testaments. 1 St. Peter 4 (v.6) allows for the interpretation that on the Son's Father-Spirit (as the third member of the Trinity fulfilling the unity of divine persons as Christ is crowned King of Kings) and being conferred from the cross with the words, "Eloi, Eloi! Lama Sabachtani",  was thereby born or separated as the timeless Word (or Angel) of God (John 1 and 5) with the character and memory of Christ, even giving permission for creation "Let there be.." (Genesis 1) . This also has been the traditional interpretation of the earliest Church Fathers as well as the apostle Paul himself, who identifies the rock that was with Moses in the desert, and the speaking burning bush, as being Christ. For a more thorough list of "God sightings", or theophanies, see the examples above under "Judaism, Hebrew Bible."

Latter Day Saint movement

Joseph Smith, the prophet and founder of the Latter Day Saint movement, said that when he was 14 years old he was visited by God the Father and Jesus Christ in a grove of trees near his house, a theophany in answer to his spoken prayer. This "First Vision" is considered to be the founding event of the Latter Day Saint movement. The Book of Mormon describes other hierophanies and theophanies that occurred in the New World.

For example, Blake Ostler analysed the Throne-Theophany of Lehi in the First Book of Nephi and concluded that the theophanies in the Bible and the Book of Mormon have much in common.

Nontrinitarians
Those groups which have Arian Christology such as Jehovah's Witnesses may identify some appearances of angels, particularly the archangel Michael, as Christophanies, but not theophanies.

Those groups with early Unitarian or Socinian Christology such as Christadelphians and the Church of God General Conference identify the Angel of the Lord in the Old Testament much as Jews do, simply as angels. Early Christadelphians, notably John Thomas (1870) and C. C. Walker (1929), integrated angelic theophanies and God as revealed in his various divine names into a doctrine of God Manifestation which carries on into a Unitarian understanding of God's theophany in Christ and God being manifested in resurrected believers.

Islam
The most important theophany in Islam is the Mi'raj, the Prophet's ascent into heaven where he speaks to God (Allah), sometimes called "a night journey from Mecca through Jerusalem."

Baháʼí Faith

While the Baháʼí Faith does not refer to any particular events of theophany, they hold that god is manifest in the prophets.  The "Manifestation of God" is a concept that refers to what are commonly called prophets, including, among others, Zoroaster, Krishna, Gautama Buddha, Abraham, Moses, Jesus, Muhammad, the Báb, and Baháʼu'lláh. The Manifestations of God are a series of personages who reflect the attributes of the divine into the human world for the progress and advancement of human morals and civilization. The Manifestations of God are the only channel for humanity to know about God, and they act as perfect mirrors reflecting the attributes of God into the physical world.

In his 1914 publication entitled The Reconciliation of Races and Religions, Thomas Kelly Cheyne,  (18411915),  an ordained minister in the Church of England and Oxford University scholar, described theophany within the context of the Baháʼí Faith. Cheyne wrote, "...one feels that a theology without a theophany is both dry and difficult to defend. We want an avatar, i.e. a 'descent' of God in human form". Cheyne described Baháʼu'lláh as a "human being of such consummate excellence that many think it is both permissible and inevitable even to identify him mystically with the invisible Godhead." He wrote that Baháʼu'lláh was a "true image of God and a true lover of man, and helps forward the reform of all those manifold abuses which hinder the firm establishment of the kingdom of God."

A 1991 article in the Journal of Bahá’í Studies  (JBS), described "Bahá’í theophanology" as "acceptance of the Prophet, or 'Manifestation of God,' who speaks on behalf of God." The author wrote that Bahá’u’lláh  wrote a series of epistles in the 1860s to kings and rulers, including,  Pope Pius IX, Napoleon III, Tsar Alexander II of Russia, Queen Victoria, and Naser al-Din Shah Qajar, in a "forceful, theophanic voice" calling them to undertake reforms. These letters were published in a compilation entitled Summons of the Lord of Hosts in 2002. The JBS article described Bahá’u’lláh's "theophanology" as "progressivist". He claimed "spiritual authority" in these letters in which he warned western leaders of the dangers facing humanity should they choose to not act on his guidance.

Druze Faith 

While the Druze do not refer to any particular events of theophany, they believe in divine incarnation and reincarnation, i.e. the transmigration of the soul. Hamza ibn Ali ibn Ahmad is considered the founder of the Druze and the primary author of the Druze manuscripts, he proclaimed that God had become human and taken the form of man, al-Hakim bi-Amr Allah. al-Hakim bi-Amr Allah is an important figure in the Druze faith whose eponymous founder ad-Darazi proclaimed him as the incarnation of God in 1018.

Divine appearances to animals
Human religious lore includes ancient literary recordings of deities appearing to animals, usually with the animals able to relate the experience to humans using human speech:
 In numerous creation stories, a deity or deities speak with many kinds of animals, often prior to the formation of dry land on earth.
 In the Hindu Ramayana, the monkey leader Hanuman is informed by deities, and usually consciously addressed by them.
 In Chinese mythology, the Monkey King speaks with bodhisattvas, buddhas, and a host of heavenly characters.

Modern

More recently, science fiction author Philip K. Dick reportedly had a theophany on 3 February 1974, which was to become the later basis for his semi-biographic works VALIS (1981) and the posthumous Radio Free Albemuth (1985).

In 1977, Michel Potay testified he witnessed five theophanies. He published the text he says he received from God in "The Book", second part of The Revelation of Ares.

There are a large number of modern cases which have been rendered into print, film, and otherwise conveyed to broad publics. Some cases have become popular books and media, including:
 A Course in Miracles which is attested as divinely channeled
 The Attentive Heart: Conversations with Trees in which the spirits contacted are resident in species not observed to speak in the ordinary biophysical sense of human speech

These instances are distinguished from cases in which divine encounters are explicitly considered fictional by the author, a frequent motif in speculative fiction such as in Julian May's Galactic Milieu Series.

See also
 Angel of the Lord
 Beatific vision
 Darśana
 Divine revelation
 Divine inspiration
 Incarnation
 Vision (spirituality)
 The Exegesis of Philip K. Dick

References

External links

 "Eusebius of Caesarea" at the Tertullian Project
 Photo: Theophany in Siberia
 Gemara: Megillah 10b
 The Shechina returns to Earth

 
 
Great Feasts of the Orthodox Church
Religious terminology